The Western Crusaders is a Fijian former rugby union team that had a franchise area coverering Lautoka, Nadi, and Yasawa. The team played in the Colonial Cup from 2004 to 2008 before the competition ceased in 2008.

History
The franchise was one of four original teams created for the inaugural Colonial Cup in 2004. Western Crusaders made the Grand final of the 2005 Colonial Cup but lost 35–27 to Suva Highlanders. Bligh Roosters joined the 2007 competition, Western Crusaders gave up Tavua, Vatukoula, Ba and Ra to the new franchise.

Club honours
 Colonial Cup runners-up 2005, 2007,2008 colonial Cup champion

2007 Squad
Taniela Rawaqa, Jona Nareki, Kusitino Vatu, Vereniki Goneva, Atunaisa Ratu, Jo Tora, Aseri Latianara,  Waisea Luveniyali, Aporosa Vata (capt),  Sunia Nadruku, Kelepi Ketedromo, Sam Tabua, Ifereimi Naruma, Ropate Senikuraciri, Jonacani Batirua, Sikeli Donu, Aseri Tale, Sikeli Gavidi, Sikeli Nasau, Aseri Buli, Paula Cata,  Semi Lotawa

Coaching team
Iliesa Tanivula
Iferemi Tawake
Team Manager: Pete Rabuka.

External links
Western Crusaders

Defunct Fijian rugby union teams
Colonial Cup (rugby union) teams